Valemount is a village in British Columbia. Valemount may also refer to:

Valemount Airport
Valemount Elementary School
Valemount Secondary School
Valemount railway station
Valemont, a miniseries on MTV